The Beach Boys: It's OK! (originally just titled  The Beach Boys) is a 1976 television special about the Beach Boys that was directed by Gary Weis. It premiered on NBC in August 1976 and includes contemporary concert footage intertwined with interviews and other footage, including Carl Wilson flying a plane and Dennis Wilson judging a beauty pageant.

Song list
Fun, Fun, Fun
Be True to Your School
I'm Bugged at My Ol' Man
God Only Knows
I Get Around
You Are So Beautiful
That Same Song
Good Vibrations
Sloop John B
Surfin' U.S.A.
California Girls
Help Me, Rhonda
It's OK
Rock and Roll Music
Wouldn't it Be Nice

References

External links
 

1976 films
It's OK!
Films directed by Gary Weis
Concert films
Documentary films about musical groups
1970s English-language films
1970s American films